Phosphorus nitride refers to several chemical compounds of phosphorus and nitrogen:

Phosphorus mononitride
Tetraphosphorus hexanitride
Triphosphorus pentanitride